Perkinsida is an order of alveolates in the phylum Perkinsozoa.

References

Perkinsozoa
Perkinsozoan orders